Krananda is a genus of moths in the family Geometridae described by Frederic Moore in 1868.

Species
Krananda diversa Warren, 1894
Krananda extranotata Prout, 1926
Krananda latimarginaria Leech, 1891
Krananda lucidaria Leech, 1897
Krananda nepalensis Yazaki, 1992
Krananda oliveomarginata C. Swinhoe, 1894
Krananda orthotmeta Prout, 1926
Krananda peristena Wehrli, 1938
Krananda postexcisa (Wehrli, 1924)
Krananda semihyalina Moore, 1868

References

Boarmiini